Josip Križan (December 31, 1841 in Kokoriči – July 16, 1921 in  Varaždin, Croatia) was a Slovenian mathematician, physicist, philosopher and astronomer.

He studied mathematics, physics and philosophy in Graz and between 1867 and 1869 obtained a doctorate to become a professor.

Sources
Slovenian Wikipedia

20th-century Slovenian mathematicians
Slovenian physicists
20th-century Slovenian philosophers
Slovenian astronomers
1841 births
1921 deaths
People from the Municipality of Križevci
19th-century Slovenian philosophers